Beardmore can refer to:

Andrew Beardmore, better known as Andy Moor, English trance DJ, producer and remixer
Bob Beardmore, British rugby league footballer
Bud Beardmore (1939–2016), American lacrosse coach
Jim Beardmore, Former All-American lacrosse goalie and current coach
Nathaniel Beardmore (1816-1872), British engineer and hydrologist
William Beardmore, 1st Baron Invernairn, a Scottish industrialist
William Beardmore and Company, the engineering company of the above Beardmore
Beardmore 160 hp, a water-cooled aero engine built for the above company
Beardmore, Ontario, a small community in Northern Ontario
Beardmore, Victoria, a small town in Gippsland, Victoria, Australia
Beardmore Glacier in Antarctica, one of the world's largest glaciers
Beardmore Relics, Viking Age artifacts 'found' near Beardmore, Ontario; supposedly evidence of Vikings in Ontario.